Andrew Neil Hamilton (born 28 May 1954) is a British comedian, game show panellist, television director, comedy screenwriter, radio dramatist, novelist and  actor.

Early life and education
Hamilton was born in Fulham, southwest London. He was educated at Westminster City School which was then a voluntary aided grammar school and later read English at Downing College, Cambridge, where he was a member of the Cambridge University Light Entertainment Society (CULES).

Career
Hamilton first came to notice while performing at the Edinburgh Festival Fringe in the 1970s. In the mid-1970s he sustained himself by taking jobs at Harrods and the Post Office before joining the BBC in 1976.

His early radio work, mostly on BBC Radio 4 included Week Ending, The News Huddlines and The Million Pound Radio Show (with Nick Revell). He has since appeared regularly in Chelmsford 123, Have I Got News for You, The News Quiz, QI, and If I Ruled the World. Hamilton is frequently invited as a panellist on The News Quiz and as a guest panellist on I'm Sorry I Haven't a Clue.

He is the voice of Dr Elephant, the dentist in the children's show Peppa Pig. He was also the original voice of Bob Fish, who is also a dentist, in the cartoon Bob and Margaret. Hamilton is also the voice of Captain Squid, the pirate in the children's show Ben & Holly's Little Kingdom.

On 16 March 2007, he co-presented BBC Radio 4's Woman's Hour programme alongside usual presenter Martha Kearney as part of that day's Comic Relief fundraising activities, after defeating Richard Hammond and Kelvin MacKenzie in a poll.

Since 1995, Hamilton has written and played the lead role of Satan in the Radio 4 sitcom Old Harry's Game. He toured with his UK stand-up show Hat of Doom in 2008.

In 2009, Hamilton presented the BBC Four series It's Only a Theory with Reginald D. Hunter.

BBC Radio 4 broadcast two, four-part series, Andy Hamilton Sort of Remembers, in 2017 and 2018. Series 1 comprised the topics of childhood, politics, the human body, and animals, based on his own personal experiences of them.

Personal life
He has no thumb on his right hand. He joked that it was amputated when he was five "by a surgeon who felt that symmetry was over-rated" to the audience of Andy Hamilton Sort of Remembers on Radio 4 in October 2017.

He married Libby Asher in 1988, and they have three children together; as of 2005, they were living in Wimbledon, south London.

He is a supporter of Chelsea Football Club.

Writing
Hamilton has written for:

Television
Not the Nine O'Clock News (1979)
The Dawson Watch (1979-1980)
Shelley (1979)
Scotch and Wry (1980)
Who Dares Wins (1983)
Alas Smith & Jones (1984)
The Kit Curran Radio Show (1984)
Kit Curran (1986; with Guy Jenkin)
Scotch & Wry (1986)
Drop the Dead Donkey (1990; co-creator with Guy Jenkin)
Eleven Men Against Eleven (1995)
Never Mind the Horrocks (1996)
Underworld (1997)
Bob and Margaret (1998-2000)
Bedtime (2001–2003)
The Exam (2002; for the National Theatre Connections Anthology)
Trevor's World of Sport (2003)
The Armstrong and Miller Show (2007)
Outnumbered (2007–2014; co-written with Guy Jenkin)
The Two Ronnies
It's Only a Theory (2009)
Just Around The Corner (2012; Pilot only; co-written with Guy Jenkin)
Ballot Monkeys (2015)
Power Monkeys (2016)
Kate & Koji (2020–present)

Radio
The Million Pound Radio Show (with Nick Revell)
The News Huddlines
Old Harry's Game (creator, in which he also stars as Satan)
Trevor's World of Sport (radio version broadcast years: 2004, 2005 and 2007)
Revolting People (co-creator with Jay Tarses, in which he also stars as Sergeant McGurk)
Week Ending
Andy Hamilton Sort of Remembers (2017)

Film
What We Did on Our Holiday (2014)

Books
The Thatcher Papers (New English Library, 1980) (with Alistair Beaton)

References

External links
Andy Hamilton at the British Film Institute

Andy Hamilton Biography at bbc.co.uk

1954 births
Living people
Alumni of Downing College, Cambridge
Comedians from London
English male comedians
English male voice actors
English radio personalities
English radio writers
English stand-up comedians
English television directors
English television personalities
English television writers
Male actors from London
People educated at Westminster City School
People from Fulham
British male television writers